Kuttycephalus is an extinct genus of temnospondyl amphibians in the family Chigutisauridae from the Upper maleri formation of India.

See also

 List of prehistoric amphibians

References

Chigutisaurids
Triassic amphibians of Asia
Triassic India
Fossil taxa described in 1995